Stockholm Public Library (Swedish: Stockholms stadsbibliotek or Stadsbiblioteket) is a library building in Stockholm, Sweden, designed by Swedish architect Gunnar Asplund, and one of the city's most notable structures. The name is today used for both the main library itself as well as the municipal library system of Stockholm.

Architecture
Discussed by a committee of which Asplund himself was a member from 1918, a design scheme was proposed in 1922, and construction began in 1924. Partly inspired by the Barrière Saint-Martin (Rotonde de la Villette) by Claude Nicolas Ledoux, Asplund abandoned earlier ideas for a dome in favour of a rotunda whose tall cylinder gives the exterior some monumentality. In the course of its planning, he reduced elements of the classical order to their most abstract geometrical forms, for the most part eliminating architectural decor. Stockholm Public Library was Sweden's first public library to apply the principle of open shelves where visitors could access books without the need to ask library staff for assistance, a concept Asplund studied in the United States during the construction of the library. All the furnishings in all the rooms were designed for their specific positions and purposes.

Officially opened on 31 March 1928 in the presence of Prince Eugen, due to financial constraints the library was still missing its west wing which was only added in 1932 to complete the approximately square base around the rotunda of the main reading room. Stockholm Public Library is one of Asplund's most important works and illustrates his gradual shift from classicism to functionalism.

Also designed by Asplund and completed in 1931 is the parkland to the south with its large pond and the shops along Sveavägen. The three simple annex buildings to the west, too, formed part of Asplund's original concept but were designed by other architects, i.e. Erik Lallerstedt (two blocks furthest west, 1929–30 and 1932) and Paul Hedqvist (1952–53).

Charles Holden's design of Arnos Grove tube station in North London is said to be based on the Stockholm Public Library.

Holdings

Stockholm Public Library includes more than 2 million volumes and 2.4 million audio tapes, CDs and audio books.

The "international library" is the section for foreign languages, housed in two floors of an annex behind the main building, close to Odenplan. Its holdings comprise more than 100 languages with 17,000 volumes in Persian, 15,800 in Arabic, and 14,500 in Spanish. In 2007 the most borrowed languages were Russian (19,300 loans), Thai, Spanish, Arabic, Persian, Chinese, Polish and Japanese. For some of these languages, Stockholm serves public libraries in the rest of Sweden through interlibrary loans.

Proposed future expansion
In 2006, the announcement of an international architectural competition for a library extension attracted 1,170 entries, though few leading international architects participated. The new structure was to be built next to Asplund's main building, using the site occupied by the three annex buildings, whose fate (i.e. demolition or integration) was deliberately left open in the brief.

On 16 November 2007, little-known German architect Heike Hanada was declared the winner with her proposal Delphinium. Her project includes a high-rise glass building, spatially removed from Asplund's main library but connected to it by a low, podium-like structure with a semi-circular courtyard into which the slope of the Observatorielunden seems to flow.

Although Hanada was instructed to produce preliminary plans for the project's realisation, the extension was put on hold in late 2009. This was due to a change in city government with different priorities as well as a local campaign turned international about what critics saw as an unacceptable impact on the original, Asplund approved complex.

See also
 Architecture of Stockholm

References

External links

Website with several photos about Asplund's work on Stockholm Public Library
Website with several photos about Asplund's work
5 films with English subtitles about the City Library of Stockholm designed by Gunnar Asplund. See the view from the roof, enjoy all the furnitures designed by architect G. Asplund, look into the marvellous Rotunda and so on.

Libraries in Sweden
Buildings and structures in Stockholm
Government buildings in Sweden
Library buildings completed in 1928
Culture in Stockholm
Education in Stockholm
Tourist attractions in Stockholm
Modernist architecture in Sweden
1928 establishments in Sweden